Charles Gordon-Lennox, 5th Duke of Richmond,  (3 August 179121 October 1860), of Goodwood House near Chichester in West Sussex, was a British peer, soldier and prominent Conservative politician.

Origins
He was born "Charles Lennox", the son and heir of Charles Lennox, 4th Duke of Richmond (1764-1819) by his wife Lady Charlotte Gordon, the eldest child of Alexander Gordon, 4th Duke of Gordon. Until his father's death in 1819 he was styled Earl of March, a courtesy title, being one of his father's subsidiary titles.

Education
He was educated at Westminster School in London and Trinity College, Dublin.

Military career

As Earl of March, he served on Wellington's staff in the Peninsular War, during which time he volunteered to join the 52nd (Oxfordshire) Regiment of Foot's advance storming party on the fortress of Ciudad Rodrigo. He formally joined the 52nd Foot in 1813 and took command of a company of soldiers at the Battle of Orthez in 1814, where he was severely wounded; the musket-ball in his chest was never removed. During the Battle of Waterloo (1815) he was aide-de-camp to the Prince of Orange, and following the latter's wounding, served as aide-de-camp to Wellington. He was chiefly responsible for the institution in 1847 of the Military General Service Medal for all survivors of the campaigns between 1793 and 1814, considered by many belated as hitherto there had only been a Waterloo Medal. He campaigned in Parliament and also enlisted the interest of Queen Victoria. Richmond himself received the medal with eight clasps.

On 19 October 1817, he reformed the Goodwood Troop of Yeomanry Artillery, originally raised by the 3rd Duke in 1797. The unit supported the cavalry of the Sussex Yeomanry but was disbanded in December 1827. Richmond was appointed Colonel of the Royal Sussex Light Infantry Militia on 4 December 1819, and Colonel-in-Chief of its offshoot the Royal Sussex Militia Artillery, on its formation in April 1853.

Political career
Richmond sat as a Member of Parliament for Chichester between 1812 and 1819. The latter year he succeeded his father in the dukedom and entered the House of Lords where he was a vehement opponent of Roman Catholic emancipation, and later was a leader of the opposition to Peel's free trade policy, as he was the president of the Central Agricultural Protection Society, which campaigned for the preservation of the Corn Laws. Although a vigorous Conservative and Ultra-Tory for most of his career, Richmond's anger with Wellington over Catholic Emancipation prompted him to lead the Ultras into joining Earl Grey's reforming Whig government in 1830 (Lang, 1999).

He served under Grey as Postmaster General between 1830 and 1834. He was sworn of the Privy Council in 1830, and in 1831 was appointed to serve on the Government Commission upon Emigration, which was wound up in 1832.

Richmond was Lord Lieutenant of Sussex between 1835 and 1860 and was appointed a Knight of the Garter in 1829.

In 1836, on inheriting the estates of his childless maternal uncle George Gordon, 5th Duke of Gordon, he was required by the terms of the bequest to assume the surname of Gordon before that of Lennox.

Marriage and children
On 10 April 1817 he married Lady Caroline Paget (1797 – March 1874), a daughter of Henry Paget, 1st Marquess of Anglesey by his wife Lady Caroline Villiers, by whom he had five sons and five daughters:

Sons
 Charles Gordon-Lennox, 6th Duke of Richmond (1818–1903), eldest son and heir;
 Fitzroy George Charles Gordon-Lennox (11 June 1820March 1841), lost at sea aboard 
 Rt. Hon. Lord Henry Charles George Gordon-Lennox (2 November 182129 August 1886), married Amelia Brooman and left no children
 Captain Lord Alexander Francis Charles Gordon-Lennox (14 June 182522 January 1892), married Emily Towneley and left children
 Lord George Charles Gordon-Lennox (22 October 182927 February 1877), married Minnie Palmer and left no children

Daughters
 Lady Caroline Amelia Gordon-Lennox (18 June 181930 April 1890), who married John Ponsonby, 5th Earl of Bessborough;
 Lady Augusta Catherine Gordon-Lennox (14 January 18273 April 1904), who married Prince Edward of Saxe-Weimar (1823–1902);
 Lady Cecilia Catherine Gordon-Lennox (13 April 18385 October 1910), who married Charles Bingham, 4th Earl of Lucan.

Death and burial
He died at Portland Place, Marylebone, London, in October 1860, aged 69 and was succeeded in the dukedom by his eldest son Charles Gordon-Lennox, 6th Duke of Richmond (1818–1903).

See also
Duchess of Richmond's Ball

References

|-

1791 births
1860 deaths
305
205
Charles
52nd Regiment of Foot officers
Sussex Yeomanry officers
Sussex Militia officers
Knights of the Garter
Lord-Lieutenants of Sussex
March, Charles Lennox, Earl of
United Kingdom Postmasters General
March, Charles Lennox, Earl of
March, Charles Lennox, Earl of
Richmond, D5
Fellows of the Royal Society
Ultra-Tory peers
Burials at Chichester Cathedral
Members of the Privy Council of the United Kingdom
March, Charles Lennox, Earl of
Dukes of Aubigny